The following are international rankings of Botswana.

Culture

Economy

United Nations Development Programme: 2013 Human Development Index ranked  119 out of 187
World Economic Forum: Global Competitiveness Report ranked  66 out of 133

Military

Vision of Humanity, 2013 Global Peace Index ranked 32 out of 162

Politics

Transparency International: 2013 Corruption Perceptions Index ranked  30 out of 177
Reporters Without Borders 2013 Press Freedom Index ranked 40 out of 179

See also

 Cuisine of Botswana
 Communications in Botswana
 Music of Botswana
 Transport in Botswana
 List of Botswana-related topics

References

Botswana